Dr. Mohammad Reza Amin (c.1927 – 27 September 2003) was an Iranian academic who was Chancellor of Sharif University of Technology from 1968 to 1972. Amin was also President of the National Iranian Steel Industries.

Amin was a graduate of the University of California Berkeley, receiving a doctorate in physics.

In 1979, Amin joined the World Bank. He worked as division chief of the World Bank's technical department for the Europe, Middle East and North Africa region.

Amin emigrated to the United States in 1979. He died of cancer in Alexandria, Virginia, on 27 September 2003, aged 76.

References

Academic staff of Sharif University of Technology
Chancellors of the Sharif University of Technology
Rastakhiz Party politicians
1920s births
Place of birth missing
2003 deaths